Ablis is a commune in the Yvelines department in north-central France.

History
During the Franco-Prussian War, when a German unit moved to take Ablis on October 7, 1870, they were ambushed and routed by about 1,500 French militia soldiers who were supported by the citizens of Ablis. In revenge, a German cavalry division subsequently torched Ablis.

Population

Twin towns
Ablis is twinned with Wendelsheim (Germany).

References

Communes of Yvelines
Orléanais